Wadhwan City railway station  is a railway station serving in Surendranagar district of Gujarat State of India. It is under Bhavnagar railway division of Western Railway Zone of Indian Railways. Its station code is 'WC'. Passenger, Express, and Superfast trains halt here.

Wadhwan City railway station serves Wadhwan City. Wadhwan City was a princely state during the British Raj. The city of Wadhwan in the Saurashtra region of Gujarat was its capital.

Trains 

The following trains halt at Wadhwan City railway station in both directions:

 12945/46 Surat–Mahuva Superfast Express
 19579/80 Bhavnagar Terminus–Delhi Sarai Rohilla Link Express

References

Railway stations in Surendranagar district
Bhavnagar railway division